Holba is a brewery situated in Czech Republic.

Holba may also refer to:
Holba, a neighborhood in Hanušovice
Holba, obsolete unit of measure which was being used in Austrian Empire and Austrian-Hungarian Empire
Colin Holba (born 1994), American football player